Dr. Violet Kajubiri Froelich(1949) is a Uganda Legislator sister of Ugandan president Yoweri Museveni and Gen. Salim Saleh.

Background and education 
Her exact date of birth is not really known but the year is known as in his book, Sowing the Mustard Seed (Revised edition, Page 3), President Yoweri Museveni says Kajubiri was born in 1949. In the seventies, she attained a bachelor's degree and a concurrent diploma in Education majoring in biology and chemistry from Makerere University.She worked at  Makerere University as a special assistant in the department of zoology and it was during that time that she got a scholarship from Germany where she went to Hohenheim University for her master's and PhD in zoology.

Career 
served as the General Secretary of the Wildlife Clubs of Uganda. She was appointed to be a member of the Education Service Commission in 2010. Between 2008 and 2009, Kajubiri worked as a consultant for the state of Lower Saxony (Germany) on Education and Development. In 2001 to 2004, Kajubiri was also a consultant for Protestant Development Aid in Germany.

Personal life 
In her book, My Life's Journey, Janet Museveni, says Kajubiri was married to German national Hilmer Froelich and the couple has four children.

References

Year of birth missing (living people)
Living people
Ugandan activists
Ugandan women activists
Place of birth missing (living people)